Michael Powell is an American politician. He served as a Republican member for the 6th district of the Louisiana House of Representatives.

Powell attended Louisiana State University, where he earned his bachelor's degree in geology. In 1992, he attended the Paul M. Hebert Law Center, where he earned his Juris Doctor degree. In 2004, Powell won the election for the 6th district of the Louisiana House of Representatives. He succeeded B. L. Shaw. In 2007, Powell resigned from the state legislature.

Powell served as a lawyer in Shreveport, Louisiana.

References 

Living people
Place of birth missing (living people)
Year of birth missing (living people)
Republican Party members of the Louisiana House of Representatives
21st-century American politicians
Louisiana State University alumni
Louisiana State University Law Center alumni
Louisiana lawyers